Samuel Christopher Collins (born 1 June 1989) is an English former professional footballer who played as a winger for Milton Keynes Dons, Kettering Town, Hendon, Wivenhoe Town, Maidenhead United, AFC Hornchurch, Concord Rangers, 
East Thurrock United, and Cheshunt.

Playing career
Collins began his career at Milton Keynes Dons, and made his first-team debut on 1 November 2006, coming on as an 18th-minute substitute for Sean O'Hanlon in a 4–1 defeat at Brighton & Hove Albion in the League Trophy. On 22 November 2007, he joined Isthmian League Premier Division side Hendon on loan, having already completed a loan spell at Kettering Town. He was released in May 2008.

He scored a total of 18 goals in 161 appearances for Concord. He scored in the 2014 Essex Senior Cup final, as Concord beat Braintree Town 2–1, and was voted the club's Player of the Season for 2013–14. Speaking in June 2014, after securing Collins to a new contract, Rangers manager Danny Cowley said he was "irreplaceable".

Statistics

References

1989 births
Living people
Sportspeople from Southend-on-Sea
English footballers
Association football wingers
Milton Keynes Dons F.C. players
Kettering Town F.C. players
Hendon F.C. players
Wivenhoe Town F.C. players
Maidenhead United F.C. players
Hornchurch F.C. players
Concord Rangers F.C. players
East Thurrock United F.C. players
Cheshunt F.C. players
English Football League players
Isthmian League players
Eastern Counties Football League players
National League (English football) players